is a Japanese mixed martial arts and Lethwei fighter who currently competes in the bantamweight division.

Career

Shimizu is a veteran of the Japanese mixed martial arts scene and primarily fought in Pancrase and ZST, the latter where he earned the nicknames Mr. SWAT! and the Ironman of ZST. Shimizu has also competed for Deep, GLADIATOR, Road Fighting Championship, Ultimate Fighting Championship and World Victory Road.

Professional Lethwei record 

|- style="background:#c5d2ea;"
|2018-02-21
|Draw
| align="left" | Tun Lwin Moe
|Lethwei in Japan 7: Yuki
|Tokyo, Japan
|Draw
|5
|-
| colspan=9 | Legend:

Mixed martial arts record

|-
|Loss
|align=center| 35-26-11 (2)
|Joo Sang Yoo
|Decision (unanimous)
|AFC 22
|
|align=center|3
|align=center|5:00
|Ilsan, South Korea
|
|-
|Win
|align=center| 35-25-11 (2)
|Jun Doi
|Decision (split)
|GLADIATOR 017 in OSAKA
|
|align=center|2
|align=center| 5:00
|Osaka, Japan
| 
|-
|Loss
|align=center| 34-25-11 (2)
|Seiji Akao
|Decision (unanimous)
|DEEP Osaka Impact 2021
|
|align=center| 3
|align=center| 5:00
|Fukushima, Japan
| 
|-
|Loss
|align=center| 34-24-11 (2)
|Takeya Takemoto
|Decision (unanimous)
|GLADIATOR 013 in OSAKA
|
|align=center| 3
|align=center| 5:00
|Toyonaka, Japan
| 
|-
|Win
|align=center| 34-23-11 (2)
|Takuya Ishibashi
|Submission (leg scissor choke)
|CHAKURIKI 6
|
|align=center|1
|align=center|3:58
|Japan
| 
|-
|Win
|align=center| 33-23-11 (2)
|Masahiro Oishi
|Submission (armbar)
|GLADIATOR 012
|
|align=center|2
|align=center|4:48
|Osaka, Japan
| 
|-
|Loss
|align=center| 32-23-11 (2)
|Kosuke Terashima
|Decision (unanimous)
|DEEP 92 Impact
|
|align=center|2
|align=center|5:00
|Tokyo, Japan
| 
|-
|Win
|align=center| 32-22-11 (2)
|Ashkan Mokhtarian
|Decision (unanimous)
|Hex Fight Series 19
|
|align=center| 3
|align=center| 5:00
|Melbourne, Australia
| 
|-
|NC
|align=center| 31-22-11 (2)
|Mark Striegl
|NC (accidental groin strike)
|URCC 77: Raw Fury
|
|align=center|2
|align=center|N/A
|Manila, Philippines
|
|-
|Loss
|align=center| 31-22-11 (1)
|Takeshi Kasugai
|Submission (guillotine choke)
|Heat 44
|
|align=center|1
|align=center|0:28
|Nagoya, Japan
| 
|-
| Loss
| align=center| 31-21-11 (1)
| Takuya Ogura
| Decision (unanimous)
| Global Fightingsports Game 1
| 
| align=center| 3
| align=center| 5:00
| Goshogawara, Aomori, Japan
| 
|-
| Loss
| align=center| 31-20-11 (1)
| Taiyo Hayashi
| Decision (unanimous)
| Pancrase 296 - Ueda vs. Silva
| 
| align=center| 3
| align=center| 3:00
| Tokyo, Japan
| 
|-
| Loss
| align=center| 31-19-11 (1)
| Go Kashiwazaki
| Decision (unanimous)
| Zst 58 - 15th Anniversary
| 
| align=center| 2
| align=center| 5:00
| Tokyo, Japan
| 
|-
| Win
| align=center| 31-18-11 (1)
| Daiki Gojima
| Decision (split)
| Pancrase - 290
| 
| align=center| 3
| align=center| 3:00
| Tokyo, Japan
| 
|-
| Loss
| align=center| 30-18-11 (1)
| Mikael Silander
| Decision (unanimous)
| Cage - Cage 38
| 
| align=center| 3
| align=center| 5:00
| Helsinki, Finland
| 
|-
| Loss
| align=center| 30-17-11 (1)
| Soo Chul Kim
| Submission (armbar)
| Road FC 35 - Road Fighting Championship 35
| 
| align=center| 2
| align=center| 3:49
| Seoul, South Korea
| 
|-
| Loss
| align=center| 30-16-11 (1)
| Alan Yoshihiro Yamaniha
| Decision (split)
| Pancrase - 281
| 
| align=center| 3
| align=center| 3:00
| Tokyo, Japan
| 
|-
| Loss
| align=center| 30-15-11 (1)
| Rijirigala Amu
| Decision (unanimous)
| AOW - Art of War 17
| 
| align=center| 2
| align=center| 5:00
| Beijing, China
| 
|-
| Loss
| align=center| 30-14-11 (1)
| Tadahiro Harada
| Submission (armbar)
| Pancrase - 276
| 
| align=center| 2
| align=center| 2:09
| Tokyo, Japan
| 
|-
| Loss
| align=center| 30-13-11 (1)
| Xian Ji
| KO (spinning back kick)
| BFFC - Bullets Fly Fighting Championship 2
| 
| align=center| 2
| align=center| N/A
| Beijing, China
| 
|-
| Loss
| align=center| 30-12-11 (1)
| Yasutaka Koga
| Technical Decision (Split)
| Pancrase: 274
| 
| align=center| 3
| align=center| 0:11
| Tokyo, Japan
| 
|-
| Draw
| align=center| 30-11-11 (1)
| Rasul Tezekbayev
| Draw
| Alash Pride - Golden Horde
| 
| align=center| 3
| align=center| 3:00
| Almaty, Kazakhstan
| 
|-
|  NC
| align=center| 30-11-10 (1)
| Yusuke Ogikubo
| NC (Overturned by Promoter)
| Pancrase: 270
| 
| align=center| 3
| align=center| 3:00
| Tokyo, Japan
| 
|-
| Win
| align=center| 30-11-10
| Hiroaki Ijima
| Decision (split)
| Pancrase: 267
| 
| align=center| 3
| align=center| 3:00
| Tokyo, Japan
| 
|-
| Win
| align=center| 29-11-10
| Toshihiro Komiya
| Decision (Unanimous)
| Pancrase: 264
| 
| align=center| 3
| align=center| 3:00
| Osaka, Osaka, Japan
| 
|-
| Loss
| align=center| 28-11-10
| Hiroki Yamashita
| KO (Punch)
| Pancrase: 261
| 
| align=center| 2
| align=center| 2:59
| Tokyo, Japan
| 
|-
| Loss
| align=center| 28-10-10
| Yosuke Saruta
| Decision (Unanimous)
| Grandslam MMA 1: Way of the Cage
| 
| align=center| 3
| align=center| 5:00
| Tokyo, Japan
| 
|-
| Loss
| align=center| 28-9-10
| Kyung Ho Kang
| Submission (Arm-Triangle Choke)
| UFC Fight Night: Saffiedine vs. Lim
| 
| align=center| 3
| align=center| 3:53
| Marina Bay, Singapore
| 
|-
| Win
| align=center| 28-8-10
| Yuki Baba
| Submission (Armbar)
| Pancrase: 247
| 
| align=center| 3
| align=center| 1:20
| Tokyo, Japan
| 
|-
| Win
| align=center| 27-8-10
| Keisuke Fujiwara
| Decision (Unanimous)
| Zst 33: 10th Anniversary
| 
| align=center| 3
| align=center| 5:00
| Tokyo, Japan
| 
|-
| Win
| align=center| 26-8-10
| Yuta Numakura
| Submission (Triangle Choke)
| Pancrase: Progress Tour 10
| 
| align=center| 1
| align=center| 1:53
| Tokyo, Japan
| 
|-
| Win
| align=center| 25-8-10
| Toshihiro Shimizu
| Submission (Armbar)
| Zst: Battle Hazard 6
| 
| align=center| 2
| align=center| 1:30
| Tokyo, Japan
| 
|-
| Win
| align=center| 24-8-10
| Yerzhan Estanov
| Submission (Triangle Choke)
| Bushido Lithuania: vol. 51
| 
| align=center| 2
| align=center| 1:45
| Astana, Kazakhstan
| 
|-
| Loss
| align=center| 23-8-10
| Motonobu Tezuka
| Decision (Unanimous)
| Pancrase: Progress Tour 5
| 
| align=center| 3
| align=center| 5:00
| Tokyo, Japan
| 
|-
| Win
| align=center| 23-7-10
| Rob McCrum
| Submission (Armbar)
| Zst: Zst 31
| 
| align=center| 1
| align=center| 1:23
| Tokyo, Japan
| 
|-
| Win
| align=center| 22-7-10
| Alan Yoshihiro Yamaniwa
| Submission (Triangle Choke)
| Rings: Battle Genesis Vol. 9
| 
| align=center| 3
| align=center| 1:15
| Tokyo, Japan
| 
|-
| Loss
| align=center| 21-7-10
| Kohei Kuraoka
| Decision (Unanimous)
| Zst: Zst 30
| 
| align=center| 2
| align=center| 5:00
| Tokyo, Japan
| 
|-
| Win
| align=center| 21-6-10
| Yoshitaka Abe
| KO (Head Kick)
| Zst: Zst 29
| 
| align=center| 1
| align=center| 2:18
| Tokyo, Japan
| 
|-
| Draw
| align=center| 20-6-10
| Shigeki Osawa
| Draw
| Zst: Battle Hazard 5
| 
| align=center| 2
| align=center| 5:00
| Tokyo, Japan
| 
|-
| Win
| align=center| 20-6-9
| Masayuki Okude
| KO (Head Kick)
| Zst: Zst 28
| 
| align=center| 1
| align=center| 1:30
| Tokyo, Japan
| 
|-
| Win
| align=center| 19-6-9
| Manabu Inoue
| Decision (Unanimous)
| World Victory Road Presents: Soul of Fight
| 
| align=center| 2
| align=center| 5:00
| Tokyo, Japan
| 
|-
| Win
| align=center| 18-6-9
| Wataru Takahashi
| Decision (Unanimous)
| World Victory Road Presents: Sengoku Raiden Championships 15
| 
| align=center| 2
| align=center| 5:00
| Tokyo, Japan
| 
|-
| Draw
| align=center| 17-6-9
| Masamitsu Nakamura
| Draw
| Zst: Swat! 36
| 
| align=center| 2
| align=center| 5:00
| Tokyo, Japan
| 
|-
| Win
| align=center| 17-6-8
| Shin Katayama
| Submission (Kneebar)
| Zst: Battle Hazard 4
| 
| align=center| 1
| align=center| 4:13
| Tokyo, Japan
| 
|-
| Draw
| align=center| 16-6-8
| Tetsuya Yamada
| Draw (Time Limit)
| Zst: Zst 24
| 
| align=center| 3
| align=center| 5:00
| Tokyo, Japan
| 
|-
| Loss
| align=center| 16-6-7
| Keisuke Fujiwara
| Decision (Unanimous)
| Zst: Zst 23
| 
| align=center| 5
| align=center| 5:00
| Tokyo, Japan
| 
|-
| Win
| align=center| 16-5-7
| Yasuo Munakata
| Submission (Kneebar)
| Zst: Swat! 31
| 
| align=center| 2
| align=center| 2:42
| Tokyo, Japan
| 
|-
| Loss
| align=center| 15-5-7
| Koichiro Matsumoto
| Decision (Unanimous)
| Deep: 43 Impact
| 
| align=center| 2
| align=center| 5:00
| Tokyo, Japan
| 
|-
| Draw
| align=center| 15-4-7
| Isamu Sugiuchi
| Draw
| Zst: Swat! 24
| 
| align=center| 2
| align=center| 5:00
| Tokyo, Japan
| 
|-
| Win
| align=center| 15-4-6
| Takeaki Miyakawa
| Submission (Armbar)
| Zst: Zst 19
| 
| align=center| 1
| align=center| 3:30
| Tokyo, Japan
| 
|-
| Loss
| align=center| 14-4-6
| Keisuke Fujiwara
| KO (Punch)
| Zst 18: Sixth Anniversary
| 
| align=center| 2
| align=center| 0:56
| Tokyo, Japan
| 
|-
| Win
| align=center| 14-3-6
| Tetsuya Nishi
| Submission (Armbar)
| Zst: Swat! 21
| 
| align=center| 2
| align=center| 0:45
| Tokyo, Japan
| 
|-
| Win
| align=center| 13-3-6
| Kosuke Sakai
| Submission (Triangle Choke)
| Zst: Swat! 20
| 
| align=center| 2
| align=center| 1:30
| Tokyo, Japan
| 
|-
| Win
| align=center| 12-3-6
| Junro Kubota
| Submission (Triangle Choke)
| Pancrase: Shining 6
| 
| align=center| 1
| align=center| 2:37
| Tokyo, Japan
| 
|-
| Win
| align=center| 11-3-6
| Takahiro Ichijo
| TKO (Doctor Stoppage)
| Zst: Swat! 18
| 
| align=center| 2
| align=center| 1:49
| Tokyo, Japan
| 
|-
| Win
| align=center| 10-3-6
| Kenichi Ito
| KO (Punch)
| Zst: Zst 17
| 
| align=center| 2
| align=center| 4:49
| Tokyo, Japan
| 
|-
| Win
| align=center| 9-3-6
| Yoshitaka Abe
| Decision (Unanimous)
| Zst: Swat! 17
| 
| align=center| 3
| align=center| 3:00
| Tokyo, Japan
| 
|-
| Loss
| align=center| 8-3-6
| Masanori Kanehara
| Submission (Armbar)
| Zst: Zst 16
| 
| align=center| 2
| align=center| 0:42
| Tokyo, Japan
| 
|-
| Win
| align=center| 8-2-6
| Kohei Kuraoka
| Submission (Neck Scissors)
| Zst: Swat! 15
| 
| align=center| 1
| align=center| 4:36
| Tokyo, Japan
| 
|-
| Win
| align=center| 7-2-6
| Masanori Hirata
| Submission (Triangle Choke)
| Zst: Swat! 14
| 
| align=center| 1
| align=center| 4:08
| Tokyo, Japan
| 
|-
| Win
| align=center| 6-2-6
| Tetsuya Yamamoto
| Submission (Kimura)
| Zst: Zst 14
| 
| align=center| 1
| align=center| 3:40
| Tokyo, Japan
| 
|-
| Loss
| align=center| 5-2-6
| Emerson Azuma
| Submission (Triangle Choke)
| Zst: Swat! 12
| 
| align=center| 2
| align=center| 2:33
| Tokyo, Japan
| 
|-
| Win
| align=center| 5-1-6
| Kei Tanigawa
| Submission (Triangle Choke)
| Zst: Swat! 11
| 
| align=center| 1
| align=center| 2:26
| Tokyo, Japan
| 
|-
| Win
| align=center| 4-1-6
| Kenichi Ito
| Decision (Unanimous)
| Zst: Swat! 10
| 
| align=center| 2
| align=center| 5:00
| Tokyo, Japan
| 
|-
| Win
| align=center| 3-1-6
| Hiroshi Nakamura
| Submission (Triangle Choke)
| Zst: Zst 12
| 
| align=center| 1
| align=center| 4:04
| Tokyo, Japan
| 
|-
| Win
| align=center| 2-1-6
| Masayuki Iida
| Submission (Armbar)
| Zst: Swat! 8
| 
| align=center| 1
| align=center| 1:31
| Tokyo, Japan
| 
|-
| Draw
| align=center| 1-1-6
| Yasutomo Tanaka
| Draw
| Zst: Swat! 7
| 
| align=center| 2
| align=center| 5:00
| Tokyo, Japan
| 
|-
| Win
| align=center| 1-1-5
| Akira Omura
| Submission (Armbar)
| Zst: Swat! 6
| 
| align=center| 2
| align=center| 1:17
| Tokyo, Japan
| 
|-
| Draw
| align=center| 0-1-5
| Tetsuya Nishi
| Draw
| Zst: Swat! 5
| 
| align=center| 2
| align=center| 5:00
| Tokyo, Japan
| 
|-
| Draw
| align=center| 0-1-4
| Shin Katayama
| Draw
| Zst: Swat! 4
| 
| align=center| 2
| align=center| 5:00
| Tokyo, Japan
| 
|-
| Loss
| align=center| 0-1-3
| Tetsuo Uehata
| Submission (Kneebar)
| Zst: Swat! 3
| 
| align=center| 1
| align=center| 0:24
| Tokyo, Japan
| 
|-
| Draw
| align=center| 0-0-3
| Tetsuya Nishi
| Draw
| Zst: Battle Hazard 2
| 
| align=center| 1
| align=center| 5:00
| Tokyo, Japan
| 
|-
| Draw
| align=center| 0-0-2
| Tomoya Miyashita
| Draw
| Zst: Swat! 2
| 
| align=center| 2
| align=center| 5:00
| Tokyo, Japan
| 
|-
| Draw
| align=center| 0-0-1
| Shinya Oshima
| Draw
| Zst: Zst 7
| 
| align=center| 1
| align=center| 5:00
| Tokyo, Japan
|

See also
List of male mixed martial artists

References

External links
 
 
 
 
 Report: UFC rosters trimmed by four fighters: Hernandez, Shimizu, Houston, and Figueroa removed at BloodyElbow.com
 UFC Fight Night 34 results: Kyung Ho Kang beats up Shunichi Shimizu after strange first round at MMAjunkie.com

1985 births
Japanese male mixed martial artists
Japanese Lethwei practitioners
Flyweight mixed martial artists
Bantamweight mixed martial artists
Featherweight mixed martial artists
Lightweight mixed martial artists
Mixed martial artists utilizing Lethwei
Mixed martial artists utilizing shootboxing
Mixed martial artists utilizing judo
Living people
Ultimate Fighting Championship male fighters